Levan Korgalidze (born 21 February 1980) is a former Georgian midfielder and current manager of Saburtalo Tbilisi.

Korgalidze have played regularly for the Georgia national under-21 football team. His debut called up to the national team was in 2003.

He is the son of Otar Korghalidze.

External links

1980 births
Living people
Footballers from Georgia (country)
Georgia (country) international footballers
Expatriate footballers from Georgia (country)
Expatriate footballers in Latvia
Expatriate footballers in Moldova
FC Guria Lanchkhuti players
Skonto FC players
Dinaburg FC players
FC Dacia Chișinău players
Expatriate sportspeople from Georgia (country) in Moldova
Footballers from Tbilisi
Association football midfielders